OK Jedinstvo Užice is a Serbian women's volleyball club based in Užice which currently plays in the Prva League (second highest professional league in Serbia). It has won the Serbian League and Cup on multiple occasions.

Previous names
Due to sponsorship, the club have competed under the following names:
 Jedinstvo Užice (1968–1993)
 Jedinstvo Kuridža Užice (1993–1994)
 Jedinstvo Luna Užice (1994–1996)
 Jedinstvo Užice (1996–present)

History
The club was established in Yugoslavia in 1969 and had its most successful period after the dissolution of Yugoslavia in the early 1990s, dominating the first decade of the new league created in 1992 for clubs in Serbia and Montenegro. During the period from 1992 to 2005, the club won the Serbian league nine times (including eight consecutive titles from 1994 to 2001) and the Serbian Cup eight times (five consecutive titles from 1996 to 2000).

Between 1997 and 2007, the club also played in European competitions, including five editions of the Champions Cup/League and four editions of the Top Teams/CEV Cup, reaching the final of the 2001–02 Top Teams Cup.

The club plays its home matches at the Veliki Park hall in Užice.

Honours

National competitions
  Serbian League (FR Yugoslavia, Serbia & Montenegro): 9
1993–94, 1994–95, 1995–96, 1996–97, 1997–98, 1998–99, 1999–00, 2000–01, 2004–05

  Serbian Cup (FR Yugoslavia, Serbia & Montenegro): 8
1993, 1994, 1996, 1997, 1998, 1999, 2000, 2003

Team
Season 2017–2018, as of December 2017.

Notable players

References

External links
 Profile at srbijasport.net 

Jedinstvo Uzice
Volleyball clubs established in 1969
1969 establishments in Yugoslavia
Sport in Užice